Horton Gristmill is a historic grist mill located at Malone in Franklin County, New York. It was built in 1853 and is a -story rectangular building with a gable roof.  It is built of Potsdam sandstone.  From 1917 into the 1950s, it was operated by the Malone Milling Company.

It was listed on the National Register of Historic Places in 1975.

References

External links

Grinding mills on the National Register of Historic Places in New York (state)
Industrial buildings completed in 1853
Buildings and structures in Franklin County, New York
Grinding mills in New York (state)
National Register of Historic Places in Franklin County, New York
1853 establishments in New York (state)

The building has fallen into disrepair. A new roof would go a long way towards helping saving it, as its a jewel of old architecture and history right in the midst of town and, if restored, its possibilities are endless.